Dallaforia is a genus of sea snails, marine gastropod mollusks in the family Cochlespiridae.

Species
 Aforia (Dallaforia) crebristriata (W.H. Dall, 1908)

References

 SYSOEV, A.V. & Y.!. KA NTOR. 1987. Deep-sea gastropods of the genus Aforia (Turridae) of the Pacific: species composition, systematics, and functional morphology of the digestive system. Veliger 30 (2): 105-126

External links
   Bouchet, P.; Kantor, Y. I.; Sysoev, A.; Puillandre, N. (2011). A new operational classification of the Conoidea. Journal of Molluscan Studies. 77, 273-308